Tobey Butler (born December 23, 1959) is a former American NASCAR driver. He finished in the top-10 in points in the inaugural year of the Craftsman Truck Series and then did a limited schedule.

Career 
He was the 1987 champion of the NASCAR Northwest Series. He has 20 wins, 68 Top 5, 87 Top 10 and 13 pole positions in 116 starts in the series.

Before competing in the inaugural season in the truck series, Butler made one lone attempt to qualify for a Winston Cup series event at Sonoma in 1994 driving for Bill Stroppe Motorsports, but without success. Butler was one of the drivers who participated in the exhibition races the CTS held later that year in preparation for 1995, the series' first full season. Butler signed to drive No. 21 Ortho Ford. He had five top-10 finishes in the twenty race schedule, his best finishes being a pair of 4th places at Louisville and Portland, and finished 10th place in points.

In 1996, Butler was forced out of the No. 21 racetrack and ended up doing a six-race schedule for Ken Schrader's No. 52 team. In his first outing with the team at Evergreen, Butler won his first career pole and went on to finish sixth. In the other five races, he would tack on two more top-10 finishes. A sixth at Phoenix would match the Evergreen run.

Butler moved around in 1997, ending up running for Schrader and the No. 60 TKO Motorsports team. He struggled in the races for Schrader. In ten starts with that team, he only had one top ten finish: 9th at Portland. This led to his release from the TKO team. In three races with that team, he managed a pair of twelfth place runs. He has not raced in NASCAR since.

Motorsports career results

NASCAR
(key) (Bold – Pole position awarded by qualifying time. Italics – Pole position earned by points standings or practice time. * – Most laps led.)

Winston Cup Series

Craftsman Truck Series

External links
 

Living people
1959 births
Sportspeople from Kirkland, Washington
Racing drivers from Seattle
Racing drivers from Washington (state)
NASCAR drivers